Abdellah Medjadi Liegeon (born 13 December 1957) is a former footballer who played as a right-back.

Born in Oran, Algeria, Liegeon spent his career in France, playing with Besançon RC, AS Monaco and RC Strasbourg and was part of Algeria's team at the 1986 FIFA World Cup, where his defensive mistake allowed Brazil's Careca to score the only goal of the game in the two countries' first-round encounter.

Honours
Monaco
 Coupe de France: 1985
 Ligue 1: 1982

External links
 
 Profile

Living people
1957 births
Footballers from Oran
Association football fullbacks
Algerian footballers
Algerian expatriate footballers
Algeria international footballers
Expatriate footballers in France
Expatriate footballers in Monaco
Racing Besançon players
Ligue 1 players
Ligue 2 players
AS Monaco FC players
RC Strasbourg Alsace players
1986 FIFA World Cup players
Algerian expatriate sportspeople in France
Algerian expatriate sportspeople in Monaco
21st-century Algerian people